Polanský (Czech feminine: Polanská) is a surname. It may refer to:

 Adrian Polansky (born c. 1950), American politician
 David Polansky (1919–2003), American basketball coach
 Jiří Polanský (born 1981), Czech ice hockey player
 Larry Polansky (born 1954), American musician
 Mark L. Polansky (born 1956), American aerospace engineer and astronaut
 Paul Polansky (1942–2021), American writer and Romani activist
 Peter Polansky (born 1988), Canadian tennis player
 Ron Polansky, American philosopher
 Sol Polansky (1926–2016), American diplomat
 Tadeáš Polanský (1713–1770), Czech Jesuit and physicist

See also
 
 Polanski (surname)

Czech-language surnames
Slovak-language surnames